Jerry Lee Wilson (born July 17, 1973) is a former professional American football safety most recently in 2006 with the San Diego Chargers of the National Football League (NFL). He has also played for the Miami Dolphins and the New Orleans Saints.  Wilson played college football at Southern University. He graduated from LaGrange Senior High in Lake Charles, Louisiana.

1973 births
Living people
American football safeties
Sportspeople from Lake Charles, Louisiana
Players of American football from Louisiana
Southern Jaguars football players
Miami Dolphins players
New Orleans Saints players
San Diego Chargers players
Tampa Bay Buccaneers players